The  2018–19 FC Dinamo București season is the 70th consecutive edition in Liga I, following Liga I 2018-19, of competitive football by Dinamo București. It competed in Cupa României 2018-2019.

Previous season positions

Competitions

Liga I

The Liga I fixture list was announced on 5 July 2018.

Regular season

Table

Results summary

Results by round

Matches

Relegation round

Table

Results summary

Position by round

Matches

Cupa României

Dinamo București will enter the Cupa României at the Round of 32.

See also

 2018–19 Cupa României
 2018–19 Liga I

References

FC Dinamo București seasons
Dinamo, București, FC